Las Quemas Airport,  is an airport  south of Osorno, a city in the Los Lagos Region of Chile.

There are unmarked power lines along the highway just short of the Runway 14 threshold.

See also
Transport in Chile
List of airports in Chile

References

External links
OpenStreetMap - Las Quemas
OurAirports - Las Quemas
FallingRain - Las Quemas Airport

Airports in Chile
Airports in Los Lagos Region